is a Japanese ice sledge hockey player. He was part of the Japanese sledge hockey team that won a silver medal at the 2010 Winter Paralympics.

His left leg was amputated above the knee following a traffic accident at age 18.

References

External links 
 

1968 births
Living people
Japanese sledge hockey players
Paralympic silver medalists for Japan
Paralympic sledge hockey players of Japan
Ice sledge hockey players at the 2010 Winter Paralympics
Medalists at the 2010 Winter Paralympics
Sportspeople from Kobe
Japanese amputees
Paralympic medalists in sledge hockey